Abdoulaye Bakayoko (born 15 December 2002) is an Ivorian professional footballer who plays as a centre-back for French  club Le Puy on loan from Saint-Étienne.

Career
Bakayoko is a youth product of Saint-Étienne, and signed his first professional contract with the club on 28 May 2021. He made his professional debut with Saint-Étienne in a 2–1 Ligue 1 loss to Lens on 15 January 2022.

On 28 January 2023, Bakayoko was loaned by Le Puy in Championnat National.

References

External links
 
 EVCT Profile

2002 births
People from Lagunes District
Living people
Ivorian footballers
Association football defenders
AS Saint-Étienne players
Le Puy Foot 43 Auvergne players
Ligue 1 players
Ligue 2 players
Championnat National 3 players
Ivorian expatriate footballers
Ivorian expatriate sportspeople in France
Expatriate footballers in France